Leonard Hill is a  mountain in Schoharie County, New York. It is located east-southeast of North Blenheim. Safford Hill is located northwest and Hubbard Hill is located southeast of Leonard Hill. In 1948, the Conservation Commission built an  steel fire lookout tower on the mountain. The tower ceased fire watching operations at the end of the 1988 season and was officially closed in early 1989. The tower remains on the summit, but is closed to the public. A local group is planning to restore the tower and reopen it to the public.

History
In 1948, the Conservation Commission built an  Aermotor LS40 tower on the mountain. The tower was previously standing at Gilbert Lake State Park from 1932 until it was dismantled and moved. Due to the increased use of aerial detection, the tower ceased fire watching operations at the end of the 1988 season. In early 1989, the tower was officially closed by the New York State Department of Environmental Conservation. The tower remains on the summit, but is closed to the public. Recently a local group has begun plans to restore the tower.

References

Mountains of Schoharie County, New York
Mountains of New York (state)